State Highway 33 (SH-33) is a state highway in eastern Idaho, spanning from U.S. Highway 20 (US 20) and US 26 to Wyoming Highway 22 (WYO 22) at the state line.

Route description

SH-33 begins at an intersection with US 20/US 26 in Butte County. It proceeds northwesterly, passing through rural area of the Idaho National Laboratory, before bending and traveling northward. The highway continues northward until intersecting with the Little Lost River Highway, and turning east. The road proceeds eastward, before intersecting SH-22.

After continuing eastward, the roadway bends northwest for a short distance, before bending back eastward. The route continues eastward, passing the Mud Lake Airport, and meeting SH-28. The roadway continues eastward, continuing through rural area, before reaching an interchange with Interstate 15 (I-15). The highway proceeds eastward, passing over the Snake River, and continuing eastward. 

The road enters Rexburg, reaching an interchange with US 20. The route continues eastward into Rexburg, before turning northward. The highway proceeds northward out of Rexburg, before bending northeast, traveling parallel to US 20. The roadway bends eastward, passing through Sugar City, before turning north. The route bends back eastward, and proceeds to the community of Teton.

The highway continues east, passing through Newdale, and continuing through rural area. It continues, bending southeast, before bending northeastward, and afterward, bending back southeast. The highway travels east, intersecting SH-32, before turning south. The route passes the Driggs-Reed Memorial Airport and enters the city of Driggs. The road proceeds southward through Driggs, intersecting SH-31 in the community of Victor, and bending southeast.

Major intersections

See also

References

External links

033
Transportation in Butte County, Idaho
Transportation in Jefferson County, Idaho
Transportation in Madison County, Idaho
Transportation in Fremont County, Idaho
Transportation in Teton County, Idaho